David Cohen may refer to:

Academia
 David Cohen (historian) (1882–1967), Dutch historian, Holocaust survivor
 David Cohen (rabbi) (1887–1972), Rabbi, talmudist, philosopher, and kabbalist
 David Cohen (physicist) (born 1930), M.I.T. physicist
 David B. Cohen (psychologist) (1941–2004), American psychology professor
 David K. Cohen (1934–2020), American education theorist
 David Mark Cohen (1952–1997), playwriting professor at the University of Texas at Austin
 David William Cohen (born 1943), professor of history and anthropology

Business
 David Cohen (entrepreneur) (born 1968), American entrepreneur
 David Cohen (died 2002), founder of John's Bargain Store
 David Oliver Cohen (born 1980), American writer, actor and entrepreneur

Government and politics
 David Cohen (intelligence), New York City Police Department deputy commissioner, former CIA official
 David Cohen (politician) (1914–2005), American lawyer and Democratic politician in Philadelphia, PA
 David B. Cohen (mayor) (born 1947), American politician, mayor of Newton, Massachusetts
 David Jacob Cohen (died 1959), Indian politician
 David L. Cohen, American politician and US ambassador to Canada
 David S. Cohen (attorney) (born 1963), Deputy Director of the Central Intelligence Agency

Journalism and writing
 David Cohen (art critic) (born 1963), founding editor of artcritical.com, art critic, art historian, curator, and publisher
 Dave Cohen (sportscaster) (born 1951), American sportscaster and actor
 Dave Cohen (writer), writer for television, radio and the Huffington Post
 David Elliot Cohen (born 1955), American editor and publisher
 David Mark Cohen (1952–1997), playwriting professor at the University of Texas at Austin
 David Steven Cohen (born 1967), American TV writer (Strangers with Candy, Courage the Cowardly Dog)
 David X. Cohen (born 1966), American TV writer and producer (The Simpsons, Futurama)

Others
 Dave Cohen (American football) (born 1966), American college football coach
 Dave Cohen (keyboardist) (born 1985), keyboardist
 David Bennett Cohen (born 1942), keyboardist and guitarist
 David Cohen (cellist) (born 1980), classical cellist from Belgium
 David Cohen (military) (1917–2020), member of the United States Army and school teacher
 David Cohen (diplomat), Israeli diplomat
 David Cohen (lawyer) (born 1946), Canadian immigration lawyer

See also
 Jack the Ripper suspects#David Cohen
 David Cohen Nassy (1612–1685), Portuguese converso and colonialist